Andover is a neighborhood in Miami Gardens, Florida. It was formerly a census-designated place. The population was 8,489 at the 2000 census. Transmitters for several Miami television stations are located in Andover.

Geography
Andover is located at  (25.966019, -80.205193).

According to the U.S. Census Bureau, the CDP has a total area of 4.6 km2 (1.8 mi2). 4.4 km2 (1.7 mi2) of it is land and 0.3 km2 (0.1 mi2) of it (6.15%) is water.

Demographics

As of the census of 2000, there were 8,489 people, 3,472 households, and 2,131 families residing in the CDP.  The population density was 1,951.0/km2 (5,064.4/mi2).  There were 3,956 housing units at an average density of 909.2/km2 (2,360.1/mi2).  The racial makeup of the CDP was 22.04% White (13% were Non-Hispanic White,) 70.97% African American, 0.27% Native American, 1.14% Asian, 0.02% Pacific Islander, 3.07% from other races, and 2.47% from two or more races. Hispanic or Latino of any race were 14.81% of the population.

There were 3,472 households, out of which 31.6% had children under the age of 18 living with them, 32.4% were married couples living together, 23.4% had a female householder with no husband present, and 38.6% were non-families. 33.6% of all households were made up of individuals, and 17.1% had someone living alone who was 65 years of age or older.  The average household size was 2.44 and the average family size was 3.11.

In the CDP, the population was spread out, with 26.4% under the age of 18, 9.3% from 18 to 24, 30.6% from 25 to 44, 18.6% from 45 to 64, and 15.2% who were 65 years of age or older.  The median age was 34 years. For every 100 females, there were 78.6 males.  For every 100 females age 18 and over, there were 71.2 males.

The median income for a household in the CDP was $31,779, and the median income for a family was $41,367. Males had a median income of $30,660 versus $26,686 for females. The per capita income for the CDP was $17,798.  About 11.5% of families and 15.8% of the population were below the poverty line, including 17.3% of those under age 18 and 27.7% of those age 65 or over.

As of 2000, before being annexed to Miami Gardens, English as a first language accounted for 74.96% of all residents, while Spanish accounted for 17.91%, French Creole accounted for 4.61%, French made up 1.58%, West African Niger-Congo languages (Kru, Igbo and Yoruba) were at 0.52%, and Yiddish was the mother tongue for 0.39% of the population.

Education
Miami-Dade County Public Schools operates public schools in the area. Schools in the former CDP include:
 Andover Middle School

References

Further reading
 
 The 1990 U.S. Census Bureau map of Dade County, Florida has this CDP on Page 3

External links
 City of Miami Gardens official website

Former census-designated places in Miami-Dade County, Florida
Neighborhoods in Miami Gardens, Florida
Former census-designated places in Florida